The Van's Aircraft RV-15 is an American amateur-built aircraft that is under development by Van's Aircraft of Aurora, Oregon. It was first publicly shown at the AirVenture airshow in July 2022. The aircraft is intended to be supplied as a kit for amateur construction, but as of July 2022 the company is not yet accepting deposits for delivery positions.

Development
The RV-15 will be the first high-wing design for the manufacturer, a company known for its low-wing aircraft. The design was developed based on input from customers. Development was started with a "pine pigeon" wooden mock-up.

The aircraft was designed by a 12-person engineering team starting in 2019. The design team included Van's chief engineer and current president Rian Johnson; Rob Heap, formerly of Scaled Composites and also Cessna; Brian Hickman formerly of Glasair Aviation and Axel Alvarez, a civilian graduate of the United States Naval Test Pilot School.

The prototype was constructed from computer assisted design parts utilizing matched-hole technology, with punch presses and computer numerical control machines working directly from the engineering design drawings.

First flight was in June 2022 and the engineering prototype was first publicly shown at AirVenture 2022 in July 2022. Kit production is expected to commence by the summer to the end of 2023.

By the end of January 2023, the aircraft has been substantially re-designed as a result of feedback from the flight test program. Changes includes a new wing design with a different internal structure, located further aft; a wider aft fuselage; a more sloped windshield; relocated landing gear and a relocated flap handle from the cockpit ceiling to the floor.

Design
The aircraft features a strut-braced high-wing, a two-seats-in-side-by-side configuration enclosed cabin accessed by doors, fixed conventional landing gear with tundra tires and an internal shock absorbing mechanism, plus a single engine in tractor configuration. A tricycle landing gear version is planned.

The aircraft is made from aluminum sheet, with a composite engine cowling. Its wing employs a Steve Smith custom airfoil and mounts large Fowler flaps. The Lycoming O-360 will be an option.

The tail is an all-flying stabilator type with a trim tab plus an anti-servo tab. The stabilator is intended to provide greater pitch authority at less weight.

The main and tailwheels use suspension made by Monster Shocks of Lincoln, California.

The rudder uses cable controls, while the stabilator and ailerons use push-pull tubes. The flaps will likely end up as cable-operated and were initially intended to have a cockpit ceiling-mounted flap actuation handle, later changed to a floor-mounted handle.

The crew doors are steel-tube frames with Plexiglas. There is a large baggage compartment behind the seats, accessed via an external door.

Operational history
By July 2022, one example had been registered in the United States with the Federal Aviation Administration, the engineering test prototype, indicated as an RV-8X.

In a review written at the factory while trying out the incomplete prototype, KitPlanes writer Paul Dye noted, "Visibility from the cockpit on the ground appears to be excellent. Comparing it to similar taildragging high-wings, I’d have to say that it is superior to most. The upright seating allows you to easily move your head forward to see around the forward door post if required to see what’s coming up in a turn. And the view over the top cowl was excellent for taxiing. The design eye height is fairly high in the cockpit, and an extra cushion (on top of the temporary seats) was required to get my average height up to that level—but once I did, it sort of felt like I was sitting in an Air Tractor, casually surveying a large domain. I liked it!"

An Aircraft Owners and Pilots Association review by Dave Hirschman noted, "Van’s officials are notoriously tight-lipped about the RV–15's performance figures, but they did say they set ambitious design goals and they expect the new airplane to meet them. For example, they wanted the RV–15 to take off and land in 400 feet or less, and have a top speed in level flight of at least 140 knots."

Specifications

References

External links

Van's aircraft
2020s United States sport aircraft
2020s United States civil utility aircraft
Single-engined tractor aircraft
High-wing aircraft
Homebuilt aircraft
Aircraft first flown in 2022